WASP-4 is a G-type main sequence star approximately 891 light-years away in the constellation of Phoenix. Despite its advanced age, the star is rotating rapidly, being spun up by the tides raised by a giant planet on close orbit.

Planetary system
In 2007 the extrasolar planet WASP-4b was discovered orbiting this star. With an orbital period of just 1.3 days it is classified as a hot Jupiter. The planetary orbit is subject to rapid decay, with decay timescale of 15.77 million years. Another superjovian planet in the system is suspected.

See also
 SuperWASP
 List of extrasolar planets

References

External links
 
 

Phoenix (constellation)
G-type main-sequence stars
Planetary systems with one confirmed planet
Planetary transit variables
4
J23341508-4203411